Live at Massey Hall may refer to:

 Directions in Music: Live at Massey Hall, 2002 Herbie Hancock album
 Live at Massey Hall 1971, Neil Young album released in 2007
 Live at Massey Hall (Matthew Good album), 2008 live album by Matthew Good
 Live at Massey Hall (Blue Rodeo album), 2015

See also
Jazz at Massey Hall, 1953 album featuring Dizzy Gillespie, Charlie Parker, Bud Powell, Charles Mingus, and Max Roach